Elena Palmer is a German journalist and author with Russian origins.

Biography 

Elena Palmer is the author of the biography Peter III - The Prince of Holstein (Sutton Publishing, Germany, 2005), herein she is expressing reasonable doubt towards the common portrayal of Russian emperor Peter III. In her work Palmer is referencing and questioning Peter III's wife Catherine the Great's memoirs. According to Palmer's research Catherine initiated Peter's murder and
illegally succeeded his throne, while later characterizing him as an “idiot”, “drunkard of Holstein”, “good-for-nothing” in order to improve her own bad reputation among the people of Russia. Elena Palmer says: "Peter III was neither a drunkard nor a moron. His plans for the dramatic transformation of society reveal a young Emperor's vision that was far ahead of his contemporaries. Peter took a position of “enlightened absolutism”, which was very new and progressive for this period in Russian history. With his democratic approaches, Peter was in a position to lead Russia out of the impasse of feudalism and was able to create a new social order without bloodshed. He proved his fortitude with ambitious reforms and gave the country hope for economic and social advancements. There were no political reasons for Peter's overthrow, as the people loved their Emperor and his supporters idolized him. Rather, the fate of Peter III was a family tragedy the likes of a Shakespeare drama. The queen's lover killed her husband while she silently supported him in this treacherous act" 

Thanks to her knowledge of both old German and old Russian languages and after having spent months in Russian and German historical archives Palmer has found out a different truth about Peter III: a cultivated, open-minded emperor who tried to introduce various courageous, even democratic reforms in the 18th century Russia. Her work is considered unique in its unbiased and scientifically correct historical information. In her book she called upon the German people to revise the account and to build a monument for Peter III.
As a result, a fundraiser association  has been established, and the monument has been built in Kiel by A. Taratynov. On 2018 another monument erected in Oranienbaum palace complex, Russia. Palmer earned her PhD in history from Eastern Illinois University in 2003. Her ongoing research on Russian-German history includes the entire reign of Romanov-Holstein-Gottorp's dynasty from its founder Peter III. to the last Russian emperor, Nicholas II.

Literary works 
„Peter III. Der Prinz von Holstein“ (Sutton Publishing, Germany, 2005)

Personal life 

Elena Palmer graduated with a master's degree in arts from Sorbonne, Paris. She is an active freelancer with different media networks, while continuing to write novels and hold University lectures in Germany, Russia and the US. She currently resides in Kiel, Germany.

Political involvement 
On October 3, 1993, Elena Palmer was one of the few foreign journalists to film the Parliament Revolution in Moscow. The events of that night are publicly considered the "second October Revolution" and resulted in hundreds of deaths. Her documentary received multiple awards and aired in many countries.

References

External links 

Living people
21st-century German women writers
German women novelists
German journalists
Russian journalists
Russian women writers
Year of birth missing (living people)